Jake Christopher Clifford Millar (8 August 1995 – 29 November 2021) was a New Zealand entrepreneur and businessman who founded companies Oompher and Unfiltered.

Early life
Millar was born in Christchurch, New Zealand and was the son of Robyn and the late Rod Millar. He was raised in Greymouth. Rod Millar died in the 2010 Fox Glacier FU-24 crash.

Millar was ambitious about business from a very young age. During his primary school years Millar's Mother Robyn helped him create and sell fridge magnets outside of supermarkets.

Also with the influence of his fathers Sky Diving Business growing up, Millar saw that business was something he wanted to get into as he got older.

Career 
Millar's professional business career started early during his teenage years when he was attending Christchurch Boys' High School, where he was Head Boy in 2013. There he founded his first company, Oompher, a career advice platform. Still a teenager, he would sell Oompher to the New Zealand Government, with the platform being taken up by Careers New Zealand just after 10 months from beginning Oompher.

Unfiltered 
Millar's next venture was Unfiltered which he founded in 2015, a platform that provides inspirational interviews and advice from high-profile individuals. 

Despite the promise of the idea with nearly $5 million raised and a $12+ million valuation at its peak, the business failed and he sold Unfiltered in early 2021 to Crimson Education for $120,000 in cash and shares.

Personal life and death 
Following the sale of his business, pressure from investors and New Zealand media led Millar to leave the country for Kenya, where he lived in Karen, a suburb of Nairobi. He had previously lived in Auckland and New York City.

On 29 November 2021, at age 26, Millar died by suicide at his home in Karen.

References 

1995 births
2021 deaths
21st-century New Zealand businesspeople
New Zealand expatriates
New Zealand expatriates in the United States
People from Christchurch
Suicides by hanging
Suicides in Kenya